The 2009 Major League Soccer season was the 14th season of Major League Soccer. The season began on March 19 and ended with MLS Cup 2009 on November 22 at Qwest Field in Seattle. Expansion team Seattle Sounders FC debuted as the league's 15th franchise and were the second in MLS history to qualify for the MLS Cup Playoffs. Real Salt Lake won their first MLS Cup by defeating the Los Angeles Galaxy in a penalty shootout.

Changes from the 2008 season

The following changes were made since the 2008 season:
 Seattle Sounders FC began play as an expansion team in the Western Conference.
 Two teams signed shirt sponsorship deals:
 Xbox 360 Live became the shirt sponsor of Seattle Sounders FC.
 Amway Global became the shirt sponsor of the San Jose Earthquakes.
 The top two teams from each conference will qualify automatically for the playoffs (down from three). In addition, the next four highest point totals, regardless of conference, will also qualify (up from two).
 Sigi Schmid did not sign a new contract with the Columbus Crew and was hired as head coach of Seattle Sounders FC.
 The Columbus Crew promoted assistant coach Robert Warzycha to head coach.
 After three seasons, the MLS Reserve Division was discontinued. As a result, each team's Developmental Roster spots were reduced from 10 to four, and each team's Senior Roster spots were increased from 18 to 20. This had the effect of reducing each team's total roster from 28 to 24 players.

Competition format
The format for the 2009 season was as follows:
 The season began on March 19 and ended on November 22 with MLS Cup 2009.
 The 15 teams were split into two conferences. The Western Conference had eight teams with the addition of Seattle Sounders FC, and the Eastern Conference had seven teams.  Each team played a total of 30 games that were evenly divided between home and away games.  Each team played every other team twice, home and away, for a total of 28 games.  The remaining two games were played against two conference rivals, one at home and one away.
 The two teams in each conference with the most points qualified for the 2009 MLS Cup Playoffs.  In addition, the next four highest ranked teams, regardless of conference, also qualified.  Teams were bracketed by conference, with the lowest ranked teams crossing over to the other conference if necessary.  In the Conference Semifinals, aggregate goals over two matches determined the winners.  The Conference Finals were played as single matches, and the winners advanced to MLS Cup 2009.  After the completion of any round, ties were broken with two 15-minute periods of extra time, followed by penalty kick shootout if necessary.  The away goals rule was not used in any round.
 The team with the most points in the regular season won the MLS Supporters' Shield and qualified directly into the Group Stage of the 2010–11 CONCACAF Champions League.  The MLS Cup Winner also qualified for the Champions League Group Stage.  The MLS Cup Runners-Up and the 2009 Lamar Hunt U.S. Open Cup Winners qualified for the preliminary round of the Champions League.  If a team qualified for multiple berths into the Champions League, then additional berths were awarded to the highest-placed team(s) in the 2009 MLS regular season's overall standings that had not already qualified.
 The four teams with the most points, regardless of conference, who had not qualified for the Champions League qualified for SuperLiga 2010.
 The six U.S.-based teams with the most points, regardless of conference, qualified for the third round of the 2010 U.S. Open Cup.  The remaining U.S.-based MLS teams had to qualify for the remaining two berths via a series of play-in games.
 As a Canadian-based team, Toronto FC could not qualify through MLS for the Champions League or the U.S. Open Cup.  In either case, any berth earned by Toronto FC was awarded to the highest-placed team in the overall standings which had not already qualified.  Their means of entry into the Champions League is the Canadian Championship; they won that competition in both 2009 and 2010 to gain entry to the Champions League for 2009–10 and 2010–11.

Tiebreakers
 Head-to-Head (Points-per-match average)
 Overall Goal Differential
 Overall Total Goals Scored
 Tiebreakers 1-3 applied only to matches on the road
 Tiebreakers 1-3 applied only to matches at home
 Fewest team disciplinary points in the League Fair Play table
 Coin toss
If more than two clubs are tied, once a club advances through any step, the process reverts to Tiebreaker 1 among the remaining tied clubs  recursively until all ties are resolved.

Results table

Standings
For an explanation of the playoff qualifications, see Competition format.

Conference standings

Eastern Conference

Western Conference

Overall standings

Playoffs

Statistics

Golden Boot

Full article: MLS Golden Boot

Stats last updated October 24, 2009.

Goalkeeping leaders

Stats last updated October 26, 2009.

Individual awards

Player of the Week

Player of the Month

Goal of the Week

Save of the Week

Save of the week was first introduced during week 10 of the 2009 season.

Team Attendance Totals

Related competitions

International competitions

CONCACAF Champions League

The Houston Dynamo continued their CONCACAF Champions League 2008–09 campaign that began during the previous season. They were eliminated in the quarterfinals over two legs by eventual champions Atlante.

Columbus (MLS Cup and Supporters' Shield winner), Houston (MLS Supporters' Shield Runner-up), New York (MLS Cup runner-up), and D.C. United (U.S. Open Cup winner), will be the representatives in the CONCACAF Champions League 2009–10—an additional slot from Canada was gained by Toronto by virtue of their Voyageurs Cup win. New York and Toronto were eliminated at the preliminary round, while D.C. advanced to the group stage on penalty kicks. Columbus and Houston qualified directly into the Group stage.  Houston and D.C. were eliminated during the group stage, with only Columbus progressing to the knockout rounds.

SuperLiga 2009

Chicago, New England, Chivas USA, and Kansas City were MLS's entrants in SuperLiga 2009, based on their finish in the 2008 regular season as the top four teams not already qualified for the CONCACAF Champions League. Chivas U.S.A. and Kansas City were eliminated in the group stage. Chicago eliminated New England in the semi-finals, only to lose to Tigres in the final.

National competitions

2009 Lamar Hunt U.S. Open Cup

MLS awarded the top six finishers in 2008, regardless of conference, automatic berths into the 2009 Lamar Hunt U.S. Open Cup's third round. Columbus, Houston, Chicago Fire, New England, Chivas USA, and Kansas City qualified based on their top-six finish.  D.C. United and Seattle qualified via an eight team qualifying tournament.

Each of the qualified MLS teams were matched up against the winner of a second-round game, all of whom come from one of the USL's three divisions. Seattle and D.C. eventually emerged to play the final on September 2 at RFK stadium, which Seattle ultimately won.

2009 Canadian Championship

Canada's top three teams, MLS's Toronto FC, USL-1's Montreal Impact and Vancouver Whitecaps FC competed in the Voyageurs Cup. The tournament was played as a double round robin group from May 6 to June 18, and won by Toronto, who gained Canada's berth into the CONCACAF Champions League 2009-10.

All-Star game

The 2009 MLS All-Star Game against Everton F.C., of the English Premier League, took place on July 29 from Rio Tinto Stadium home of Real Salt Lake. Everton defeated the MLS All-Stars in a penalty shootout 4-3 after the game was tied 1-1. No extra time was played following regular time. Tim Howard, the Everton and U.S. Men's National Team goalkeeper, was named the game's MVP.

Coaches

Eastern Conference
Chicago Fire: Denis Hamlett
Columbus Crew: Robert Warzycha
D.C. United: Tom Soehn
Kansas City Wizards: Curt Onalfo
New England Revolution: Steve Nicol
New York Red Bulls: Richie Williams
Toronto FC: Chris Cummins

Western Conference
Chivas USA: Preki
Colorado Rapids: Gary Smith
FC Dallas: Schellas Hyndman
Houston Dynamo: Dominic Kinnear
Los Angeles Galaxy: Bruce Arena
Real Salt Lake: Jason Kreis
San Jose Earthquakes: Frank Yallop
Seattle Sounders FC: Sigi Schmid

See also

 List of transfers for the 2009 Major League Soccer season
 2008 MLS Expansion Draft

References

External links
 Soccernet ESPN (Stats) Site
 MLS Site

 
Major League Soccer seasons
1
1